Scaleway (previously Online SAS or Online.net) is a French Cloud computing and web hosting company, founded by Xavier Niel in 1999 and a majority owned subsidiary of the Iliad group.
The company provides physical dedicated servers and cloud computing architectures through Scaleway Dedibox and Scaleway Elements brands,
domain registration services through the BookMyName brand, and colocation services in its datacenters through the brand Scaleway Datacenters.

The company is the second player in France with over  Tb/s of Internet traffic.

History 

In 1999, Online started its activities in web hosting and domain name registration services

In August 2002, the domain name registrar BookMyName has been bought by Iliad from the concurrent LDCom.

In May 2006, rental of dedicated servers through the Dedibox brand was launched.

In December 2008, Iliad bought Alice ADSL: They also took over construction and operation of Datacenters, launched in 1999 by ISDnet, bought by Cable & Wireless in January 2000 acquired by Tiscali France in June 2003 and finally renamed as Iliad Datacenter.

In April 2010, Online merges with Dedibox, another subsidiary of Iliad, bringing together different hosting activities under a single brand.

In 2012, the company has opened its third datacenter of 11800 m² in Vitry-sur-Seine after 11 months of construction works. The site received the first Tier-III certification in France by Uptime Institute in January 2014.

Since 2012, the company publishes in real time the PUE of its datacenters on pue.online.net, in an effort of transparency.

In 2013, Online launched labs.online.net in preview. An infrastructure as a service offer, based on dedicated hardware and without virtualization, based on ARM CPUs. The hardware is made in a factory near Laval in France.

In April 2015 the service left its beta status and has been renamed as Scaleway. As the popularity of the platform grows, Online added servers with x86_64 based CPUs in March 2016.

Repeat software entrepreneur Yann Lechelle joined as CEO in early 2020;  however, he parted ways with the company in December of 2022.

Infrastructure

Datacenters 

Scaleway owns and operates several data centers, all located in the Île-de-France region.

 DC2, with a size of  m² in Vitry-sur-Seine, within the Val-de-Marne. The building has been constructed in 1989 by NMPP (Presstalis), then successively taken over by ISDNet, Cable & Wireless, Tiscali, then Telecom Italia, and is therefore an indirect product of the acquisition of Alice ADSL by Iliad.
 DC3, with a size of  m² in the same city is divided into several private spaces. It was built in 2012 by the group. It has reached its capacity in early 2016 and works have been planned to extend its capacity by  m2.
 DC4, with a size of  m² on six floors in the 15th arrondissement of Paris, housed in the former anti-atomic fallout shelter of the "Laboratoire central des ponts et chaussées". It was built between 1936 and 1939 by architect Gabriel Héraud, the building was acquired by Iliad in 2011. The main part of the fallout shelter is being used for the C14 offer.
 DC5, with a size of  m² on four floors at Saint-Ouen-l'Aumône. It is the result of the acquisition of an old mail sorting center of La Poste, and will handle the growth from 2017-2025 of the hoster.

In the past the company operated also:
 DC1, with a size of 6300 m² in Bezons, which also hosts the network head of Free. Built in 2001 by the American company Exodus Communications then taken back by Spherion, after the bankruptcy of the company. It is leased to Iliad on a long-term contract since 2003 This site does not host any activities of Online since 2013.

Connectivity 
Since August 2013, the network of Online is AS12876 ONLINE S.A.S. It is independent of the one of Free, which was not the case before. This allowed the company to move away from the closed interconnection policy of the internet service provider.
In early 2015, the company announced to have exceeded   Gb/s of immediate Internet traffic.

In May 2016, Online shows a total of   Gb/s of capacity on his links at their weather-map and is present at the following Internet Exchange Points: France-IX, Equinix-IX, AMS-IX and Neutral Internet Exchange

Notes and references

External links 
 

Cloud computing providers
Cloud platforms
Cloud infrastructure
Cloud storage
French companies established in 1999
Internet technology companies of France
Web hosting